Americo Gonçalves (died 2014) was an Angolan journalist.

Life
In the 1990s Gonçalves founded the weekly newspapers Angolense and later A Capital.

As editor-in-chief of Angolense'', in 2000 he and another news editor were convicted of defaming a provincial governor whom the newspaper had accused of incompetence. He received a three-month suspended sentence.

Gonçalves was awarded the Maboque Journalism Prize in 2010 for his services to Angolan journalism.

He died on 2 August 2014.

References

Year of birth missing
2014 deaths
Angolan journalists
African newspaper editors